The 1996 UCI Track Cycling World Championships were the World Championship for track cycling. They took place in Manchester, United Kingdom from August 28 to September 1, 1996. Twelve events were contested, eight for the men and four for the women.

Medal table

Medal summary

External links
Official event website
UCI website
1996 reports and results at cyclingnews.com

Uci Track Cycling World Championships, 1996
Track cycling
UCI Track Cycling World Championships by year
1990s in Manchester
International cycle races hosted by England
International sports competitions in Manchester
UCI Track Cycling World Championships
UCI Track Cycling World Championships